Ecumenism, Christian Origins and the Practice of Communion is a 2000 book about Christian ecumenism by the Anglican theologian Nicholas Sagovsky. It was published by Cambridge University Press.

Reviews

2000 non-fiction books
Books by Nicholas Sagovsky
British non-fiction books
Cambridge University Press books
Christian ecumenism
Christian theology books
English-language books